The New Caledonia national under-17 football team is the national U-17 team of New Caledonia and is controlled by the New Caledonian Football Federation.

Competition Record

FIFA U-17 World Cup record

OFC U-17 Championship record

Current squad
The following players were called up for the UEFA Exhibition Tournament - Estonia from 26 April to 1 May 2022.

Caps and goals as of 20 April 2022 before the game against Kazakhstan.

2018 Squad
The following players were called up for the 2018 OFC U-16 Championship from 9 to 22 Septembre 2018.

Caps and goals as of 17 September 2018 after the game against Fiji.

2017 Squad
The following players were called up for the 2017 FIFA U-17 World Cup from 6 to 28 October 2017.

Caps and goals as of 14 October 2017 after the game against Japan.

Recent call-ups

Results and fixtures 
The following matches were played or are scheduled to be played by the national team in the current or upcoming seasons.

2017

2018

Notable results

List of coaches 
  Francis Tartas (2010–2011)
  Herve Gnipate (2010–2011)
  Kamali Fitealeata (2012–2015)
  Michael Clarque (2015–2017)
  Dominique Wacalie (2017–)

See also 
 New Caledonia national football team
 New Caledonia national under-20 football team
 New Caledonia women's national football team
 New Caledonia national futsal team
 New Caledonia national under-18 futsal team

References

External links 
 New Caledonia Football Federation official website

under-17
Oceanian national under-17 association football teams